The Cyclone Rider is a 1924 American silent adventure film directed by Tom Buckingham. Prints of the film survive in the Czech Film Archive.

Cast
 Reed Howes as Richard Armstrong
 Alma Bennett as Doris Steele
 William Bailey as Reynard Trask
 Margaret McWade as Mrs. Armstrong
 Frank Beal as Robert Steele
 Evelyn Brent as Weeping Wanda
 Eugene Pallette as Eddie
 Ben Deeley as Silent Dan
 Heinie Conklin as Remus (as Charles Conklin)
 Bud Jamison as Romulus

References

External links

1924 films
1924 adventure films
American adventure films
American silent feature films
American black-and-white films
Films directed by Tom Buckingham
Fox Film films
Silent adventure films
1920s American films